Euriphene rotundata is a butterfly in the family Nymphalidae. It is found in the Democratic Republic of the Congo (Uele).

References

Butterflies described in 1920
Euriphene
Endemic fauna of the Democratic Republic of the Congo
Butterflies of Africa